Calosoma reticulatum,  is a species of ground beetle native to northern Europe and Central Europe.

References
Calosoma inquisitor (Linnaeus, 1758)

External links

reticulatum
Beetles of Europe
Beetles described in 1787